Fossarus ambiguus is a species of sea snail, a marine gastropod mollusk in the family Planaxidae.

Distribution

Description 

The maximum recorded shell length is 3.5 mm.

Habitat 
Minimum recorded depth is 0 m. Maximum recorded depth is 40 m.

References

External links

Planaxidae
Gastropods described in 1758
Taxa named by Carl Linnaeus